The traditional colors of Japan are a collection of colors traditionally used in Japanese art, literature, textiles such as kimono, and other Japanese arts and crafts.

History

The traditional colors of Japan trace their historical origins to the Twelve Level Cap and Rank System which was established in 603 by Prince Shōtoku and based on the five Chinese elements. In this system, rank and social hierarchy were displayed and determined by certain colors.

Most names of colors originate from the names of plants, flowers, and animals that bore or resembled them. Certain colors and dyeing techniques have been used since the Asuka period, while others had been developed as late as the Meiji period when synthetic dyes became common.

Due to the long history of use of this color system, some variations in color and names exist. Many of the names of these colors originate from Chinese culture, where the hierarchical color system was historically even more complex.

Colors

Red/violet series

Red series

Yellow/red series

Yellow series

Yellow/green series

Green/blue green series

Blue/blue violet series

Violet series

Achromatic series

Notes

References

Bibliography

External links
Japanese traditional color Names 
Japanese traditional colors (archived)
 The traditional colors of Nippon (Japan)

Japanese culture
National colours
Textile arts of Japan